The Amazonian sac-winged bat (Saccopteryx gymnura) is a bat species of the family Emballonuridae native to South America.

Taxonomy and etymology
It was described as a new species in 1901 by British zoologist Oldfield Thomas. Thomas identified "Mr. Wickham" as the collector of the holotype, possibly referring to British explorer Henry Wickham who also collected bird specimens in South America. Wickham collected the holotype in Santarém along the Amazon River. The species name "gymnura" is from Ancient Greek "gumnós" meaning "naked" and "ourá" meaning "tail." Thomas wrote, "the nakedness of the interfemoral [membrane] will readily distinguish this bat from any of its allies."

Biology and ecology
It is insectivorous, catching its prey in the air and inhabits tropical rainforests. It is found in several countries and territories in northern South America, including Brazil, French Guiana, Guyana, and Suriname. It is uncommonly encountered and its range is not clearly defined.

It is currently evaluated as data deficient by the IUCN.

References

Saccopteryx
Bats of South America
Bats of Brazil
Mammals of French Guiana
Mammals of Guyana
Mammals of Suriname
Fauna of the Amazon
Mammals described in 1901
Taxa named by Oldfield Thomas